is a Japanese jidaigeki film, directed by Yoshihiro Nakamura and based on the novel Shinobi no Kuni by Ryō Wada. For international distribution, the film has been titled Mumon - The Land of Stealth. Set during the Sengoku period, the film focuses on fictional events that take place surrounding the Tenshō Iga War. Mumon: The Land of Stealth was theatrically released in Japan by Toho on July 1, 2017. The theme song for the film is "" by the Japanese group Arashi.

Plot
The warlord, Nobunaga Oda, is rapidly vanquishing his foes on a quest to pacify and unify the country under his rule. However, there is one region that even Nobunaga fears: The Iga Province, home to the Iga ninja, known to be extraordinary weapons of war who do not think of people as human and will assassinate anyone for money. There is one Iga ninja, Mumon, who is renowned as a deadly assassin and who has unmatched battle strength, earning him the nickname of Iga's strongest ninja. However, he is equally lazy and only seeks to earn money to please his wife, Okuni. At the same time, a ninja named Heibee Shimoyama becomes disillusioned with his people's way of living.

One day, Mumon kills a ninja from a different family for a reward, unaware that his actions will ultimately lead to a deadly battle between Nobunaga's army and the ninja of the Iga Province. The resulting battle evokes struggles with morality in a midst of colliding interests and political schemes.

Cast
 Satoshi Ohno as Mumon
 Satomi Ishihara as Okuni
 Ryohei Suzuki as Heibee Shimoyama
 Yūsuke Iseya as Daizen Heki
 Yuri Chinen as Nobukatsu Oda
 Yuna Taira as Rin Kitabatake
 Makita Sports as Sakyonosuke Nagano
 Danshun Tatekawa as Sandayu Momoji
 Jun Kunimura as Tomonori Kitabatake
 Denden as Kai Shimoyama
 Shinnosuke Mitsushima as Jirobe Shimoyama
 Kitaro as Hanroku Otowa

Production
The film was announced on May 31, 2016. Filming began in July 2016 and finished in October 2016. Director Nakamura commented that Ohno is an excellent fit for the role of Mumon, who has an unconventional way of thinking. The two previously worked together for the film adaptation of Kaibutsu-kun the Movie in 2011.

In preparation for his role as Mumon, Ohno took intensive training in sword fighting, specifically dagger fighting techniques using both hands. Suzuki, who plays Heibee Shimoyama, also underwent rigorous training to prepare for his role as a skilled ninja.

Release

Mumon: The Land of Stealth had its Japan premiere on May 31, 2017, with Director Nakamura and the main cast in attendance. Its theatrical release in Japan was on July 1, 2017.

The film was also shown at the 20th Shanghai International Film Festival, held from June 17 to June 26, during the Jackie Chan Action Movie Week. In addition, the film had its North American debut at the Toronto Japanese Film Festival on June 28, 2017, as well as its US premiere at the Japan Cuts film festival in New York City on July 13, 2017. Director Nakamura was in attendance at both screenings to introduce the film and answer audience questions. The film will have its Quebec premiere at the Fantasia International Film Festival on July 30, 2017.

Reception

Box office
The film performed well on its opening weekend, mobilizing 404,452 people nationwide and generating a box office revenue of $4,286,405 (approximately ¥485 million). At the time of release, this was reported to be the most successful opening weekend of the year for Japanese live action films.

References

External links
 Official site 
 

2017 films
2010s Japanese films
2010s Japanese-language films
Films directed by Yoshihiro Nakamura
Jidaigeki films
Ninja films
Samurai films
2017 action films
Films based on Japanese novels
Toho films
Films shot in Japan